Colin Nicholson (9 September 1939 – 4 February 2020) was a New Zealand cricketer. He played first-class cricket for Canterbury and Otago between 1959 and 1964.

See also
 List of Otago representative cricketers

References

External links
 

1939 births
2020 deaths
New Zealand cricketers
Canterbury cricketers
Otago cricketers
Cricketers from Oamaru